Lionel Hugh Major (21 April 1883 – 25 June 1965) was an English cricketer who played for Somerset. He was born in Wembdon, Somerset and died in Exmouth, Devon.

Major made a single first-class appearance for the side, during the 1903 season, against Sussex. From the tailend, he scored 6 runs in the first innings in which he batted, and 11 runs in the second, and he took a single wicket in the Sussex second innings. Press reports for this match describe him as "an amateur from Bridgewater [sic]"; the Somerset side was missing several regular players.

References

1883 births
1965 deaths
English cricketers
Somerset cricketers
People from Sedgemoor (district)